The term Archeparchy of Erbil may refer to:

 Archeparchy of Erbil (Church of the East), a historical archeparchy (archdiocese) of the Church of the East, in Erbil (Iraq)
 Chaldean Catholic Archeparchy of Erbil, an archeparchy (archdiocese) of the Chaldean Catholic Church, in Erbil (Iraq)

See also
 Erbil
 Archeparchy of Mosul (disambiguation)
 Archeparchy of Baghdad (disambiguation)
 Archeparchies of the Church of the East